Richard Dobbs Spaight (March 25, 1758September 6, 1802) was an American Founding Father, politician, planter, and signer of the United States Constitution, who served as a Democratic-Republican U.S. Representative for North Carolina's 10th congressional district from 1798 to 1801. Spaight was the eighth governor of North Carolina from 1792 to 1795. He ran for the North Carolina Senate in 1802, and Federalist U.S. Congressman John Stanly campaigned against him as unworthy. Taking offense, Stanly challenged him to a duel on September 5, 1802, in which Stanly shot and mortally wounded Spaight, who died the following day.

Biography
Spaight was the father of North Carolina Governor Richard Dobbs Spaight Jr. and the grandfather of U.S. Representative Richard Spaight Donnell.

Early life
Spaight was born in New Bern, North Carolina, the son of the secretary of the Crown in the colony and grand-nephew of North Carolina Governor Arthur Dobbs. Orphaned at the age of eight, he was sent to live with his Dobbs relatives at Carrickfergus in Northern Ireland and later followed his cousin Richard Dobbs to the University of Glasgow. During the American Revolutionary War Spaight returned to North Carolina, serving as aide-de-camp to Major General Richard Caswell at the Battle of Camden.

Political career

The North Carolina General Assembly elected Spaight a delegate to the Congress of the Confederation between 1782 and 1785; he then served in the North Carolina House of Commons from 1785 to 1787 and was named speaker of the House. In 1787, he was a delegate to the Philadelphia Convention that drafted the U.S. Constitution, and he signed the document when he was 29 years old.

Under the North Carolina Constitution of 1776, Spaight was nominated for governor in 1787 but was defeated by a majority in the General Assembly; he was nominated for the United States Senate in 1789 and was again defeated. In 1788, he was a member of the state convention, which voted not to ratify the Constitution, although Spaight supported ratification. On March 24, 1788, he married Mary Leach, who had the distinction of being the first lady to dance with George Washington at a ball in Washington's honor at the Governor's Palace, New Bern, in 1791.

Spaight retired from politics for several years because of ill health; he returned to the state House of Representatives in 1792. Also, in 1792, he was elected the first native-born governor of North Carolina and was re-elected by the General Assembly for two further one-year terms. During his term as governor, sites were chosen for the new state capital of Raleigh and the newly chartered University of North Carolina. Spaight was chair of the university's board of trustees during his term as governor. He stepped down as governor in 1795, having served the constitutional limit of three one-year terms.

Spaight was elected to the United States House of Representatives in 1798, filling the unexpired term of Nathan Bryan; he was elected to a two-year term in 1799, serving until 1801, and though elected as a Federalist, his views on states rights led him to become associated with the Democratic-Republican Party of Thomas Jefferson. He lost his bid for re-election to Congress but returned to state government, serving in the North Carolina Senate beginning in 1801.

Death and legacy
Spaight died on September 6, 1802, following injuries sustained in a duel with John Stanly, the Federalist congressman who had defeated him in the election of 1800 for the House of Representatives. Spaight is buried at "Clermont," near New Bern, North Carolina. Spaight Street in Madison, Wisconsin, is named in honor of Richard Spaight. Most of the main streets in downtown Madison are named after signers of the United States Constitution.

References

Bibliography

External links

 
 Richard Dobbs Spaight at The Historical Marker Database (HMdb.org)
 Richard Dobbs Spaight at the National Governors Association
 Richard Dobbs Spaight at The Political Graveyard
 
 
 
 

|-

1758 births
1802 deaths
18th-century American Episcopalians
19th-century American Episcopalians
18th-century American politicians
Alumni of the University of Glasgow
American militia officers
American people of English descent
American people of Irish descent
American planters
American politicians killed in duels
American slave owners
Burials in North Carolina
Continental Congressmen from North Carolina
Deaths by firearm in North Carolina
Democratic-Republican Party members of the United States House of Representatives from North Carolina
Episcopalians from North Carolina
Farmers from North Carolina
Federalist Party members of the United States House of Representatives from North Carolina
Federalist Party state governors of the United States
Governors of North Carolina
Members of the North Carolina House of Representatives
North Carolina militiamen in the American Revolution
People of colonial North Carolina
Politicians from New Bern, North Carolina
Signers of the United States Constitution
Founding Fathers of the United States